Robert Hermann (1869–1912) was a Swiss composer, born at Bern. He studied music at the Frankfurt Conservatory in 1891, and with Engelbert Humperdinck (1893–94). In 1895 the Berlin Philharmonic premiered his Symphony in C, and much of his further career was spent in Germany. His works include pieces for violin and piano, songs, a concert overture in D minor, a piano quartet, a piano trio, a violin sonata, etc.

In 2009 Sterling Records released a recording of Hermann's 2 symphonies conducted by Christopher Fifield.

Notes

References

Recording of the symphonies on Sterling Records
Sterling Records catalog entry. Note: both Audaud and Sterling Records have the 2nd symphony's key wrong: it's in B minor - see .

External links

1869 births
1912 deaths
Swiss classical composers
People from Bern
Hoch Conservatory alumni
Swiss male classical composers
19th-century classical composers
20th-century classical composers
20th-century male musicians
19th-century male musicians
20th-century Swiss composers